Tsenkhar Gewog (Dzongkha: སཙན་མཁར་) is a gewog (village block) in Lhuntse District, Bhutan.

References

Gewogs of Bhutan
Lhuntse District